The Nidder is a 69 km long river in Hesse, Germany, and part of the Main-Rhine system.

From its source at Herchenhainer Höhe it flows down to Bad Vilbel where it meets with the Nidda.  The Bonifatiusweg, the route taken to bring the body of Saint Boniface from Mainz to Fulda, runs along the right (north) bank of the river.

References

Rivers of Hesse
Rivers of the Vogelsberg
Rivers of Germany